Guy of Dampierre ( – 7 March 1305, Compiègne) was the Count of Flanders (1251–1305) and Marquis of Namur (1264–1305). He was a prisoner of the French when his Flemings defeated the latter at the Battle of the Golden Spurs in 1302.

Biography
Guy was the second son of William II of Dampierre and Margaret II of Flanders. The death of his elder brother William in a tournament made him joint Count of Flanders with his mother. (She had made William co-ruler of Flanders in 1246 to ensure that it would go to the Dampierre children of her second marriage, rather than the Avesnes children of her first.) Guy and his mother struggled against the Avesnes (led by John I, Count of Hainaut) in the War of the Succession of Flanders and Hainault, but were defeated in 1253 at the Battle of Walcheren, and Guy was taken prisoner. By the mediation of Louis IX of France, he was ransomed in 1256. Some respite was obtained by the death of John of Hainaut in 1257.

In 1270, Margaret confiscated the wares of English merchants in Flanders for non-payment of customs. This led to a devastating trade war with England, which supplied most of the wool for the Flemish weavers. The dispute was ended by a treaty agreed at Montreuil-sur-Mer on 28 July 1274, effectively abolishing customs charged on English merchants in Flanders. Even after her abdication in 1278, Guy often found himself in difficulties with the fractious commoners.

In 1288, complaints over taxes led Philip IV of France to tighten his control over Flanders. Tension built between Guy and the king; in 1294, Guy arranged a marriage between his daughter Philippa and Edward, Prince of Wales. However, Philip imprisoned Guy and two of his sons, forced him to call off the marriage, and imprisoned Philippa in Paris until her death in 1306. Guy was summoned before the king again in 1296, and the principal cities of Flanders were taken under royal protection until Guy paid an indemnity and surrendered his territories, to hold them at the grace of the king.

After these indignities, Guy attempted to revenge himself on Philip by an alliance with Edward I of England in 1297, to which Philip responded by declaring Flanders annexed to the royal domain. The French under Robert II of Artois defeated the Flemings at the Battle of Furnes, and Edward's expedition into Flanders was abortive. He made peace with Philip in 1298 and left Guy to his fate. The French invaded again in 1299 and captured both Guy and his son Robert in January 1300.

The Flemish burghers, however, found direct French rule to be more oppressive than that of the count. After smashing a French army at the Battle of the Golden Spurs in 1302, Guy was briefly released by the French who were negotiating terms to end the Siege of Tournai. His subjects, however, refused to compromise; and a new French offensive in 1304 destroyed a Flemish fleet at the Battle of Zierikzee and defeated the Flemings  at the Battle of Mons-en-Pévèle. Guy was returned to prison, where he died.

Family
Count Guy had two daughters named Margaret by two wives.
 
In June 1246 he married Matilda of Béthune (d. 8 November 1264), daughter of Robert VII, Lord of Bethune, and had the following children:

 Marie (d. 1297), married William of Jülich (d. 1278), son of William IV, Count of Jülich.  She had a son, William. Married in 1285 Simon II de Chateauvillain (d. 1305), Lord of Bremur.
 Robert III of Flanders (1249–1322), his successor.
 William (aft. 1249 – 1311), Lord of Dendermonde and Crèvecoeur, married in 1286 Alix of Beaumont, daughter of Raoul of Clermont and had issue. His son John of Dampierre, Lord of Crèvecœur married to Beatrice, daughter of Guy IV, Count of Saint-Pol.
 John of Flanders (1250 – 4 October 1290), Bishop of Metz and Bishop of Liège
 Baldwin (1252–1296).
 Margaret (c. 1253 – 3 July 1285), married in 1273 John I, Duke of Brabant 
 Beatrice (c. 1260 – 5 April 1291), married c. 1270 Floris V, Count of Holland 
 Philip (c. 1263 – November 1318), Count of Teano, married Mahaut de Courtenay, Countess of Chieti (d. 1303),  married c. 1304 Philipotte of Milly (d. c. 1335), no issue.

In March 1265 he married Isabelle of Luxembourg (d. September 1298), daughter of Henry V of Luxembourg, and had the following children:

 Beatrice (d. 1307), married c. 1287 Hugh II of Châtillon 
 Margaret (d. 1331), married on 14 November 1282 at Roxburgh, Alexander of Scotland (son of Alexander III of Scotland), married on 3 July 1286 in Namur, Reginald I of Guelders.
 Isabelle (d. 1323), married 1307 Jean de Fiennes, Lord of Tingry and Chatelain of Bourbourg, mother of Robert de Fiennes, Constable of France.
 Philippa (d. 1306, Paris).
 John I, Marquis of Namur (1267–1330), married Margaret of Clermont, daughter of Robert, Count of Clermont, and Marie of Artois (1291–1365), daughter of Philip of Artois and had issue.
 Guy of Namur (d. 1311), Lord of Ronse, Count of Zeeland, married Margaret of Lorraine, daughter of Theobald II, Duke of Lorraine. No issue.
 Henry (d. 6 November 1337), Count of Lodi, married January 1309 Margaret of Cleves (daughter of Dietrich VII, Count of Cleves) and had issue.
 Joan (d. 1296), a nun at Flines Abbey.

References

Sources

External links

  Maison de Dampierre.

1220s births

1305 deaths

Year of birth uncertain
Counts of Flanders
Margraves of Namur
House of Dampierre
13th-century peers of France
13th-century people from the county of Flanders